Merrimack County is the 1972 album from pioneer Folk rock musician Tom Rush. The standout tracks are "Mink Julip", "Mother Earth", "Jamaica, Say You Will", "Wind on the Water" and "Roll Away the Grey". The album was on the Billboard 200 chart for ten weeks and charted as high as #128 on June 3, 1972.

Track listing
"Kids These Days" (Tom Rush, Trevor Veitch) – 4:10
"Mink Julip"  (Tom Rush) – 2:25
"Mother Earth" (Eric Kaz) – 2:36
"Jamaica, Say You Will" (Jackson Browne) – 4:11
"Merrimack County II" (Tom Rush, Trevor Veitch) – 2:46
"Gypsy Boy" (Bob Carpenter) – 3:20
"Wind on the Water" (Tom Rush) – 3:34
"Roll Away the Grey" (Bob Carpenter) – 2:59
"Seems the Songs" (Tom Rush) – 3:39
"Gone Down River" (Tom Rush) – 4:16

Personnel

Musicians
 Tom Rush – guitar, lead vocals
 Trevor Veitch – guitar, mandolin, backing vocals
 James Rolleston – bass, backing vocals
 Gary Mallaber – drums, percussion, vibraphone
 Paul Armin – fiddle
 Erik Robertson – organ, piano
 Bill Stevenson – piano
 Kathryn Moses – flute
 John Savage – drums on "Roll Away the Grey"
 Ed Freeman - string arranger, conductor on "Wind on the Water" and "Seems the Songs"

Technical
 Tom Rush – producer
 Jay Messina – engineer
 Byron Linardos – photography
 Richard Navin – design

References

Tom Rush albums
1972 albums
Columbia Records albums